Aliabad-e Pir Shams ol Din (also Romanized as ‘Alīābād-e Pīr Shams ol Dīn and ‘Alīābād-e Pīr Shams od Dīn; also known as ‘Alīābād) is a village in Jolgeh Rural District, in the Central District of Asadabad County, Hamadan Province, Iran. At the 2006 census, its population was 98, in 22 families.

References 

Populated places in Asadabad County